House Full: Live at the L.A. Troubadour not to be confused with its earlier counterpart Live at the L.A. Troubadour is the only currently available live Fairport Convention album to feature Richard Thompson as a band member.

Track listing
Side 1
"Sir Patrick Spens" (Trad. Arr. Fairport Convention) 3'06"  
"Banks of the Sweet Primroses" (Trad. Arr. Fairport Convention) 4'28"  
"The Lark in the Morning Medley" (Trad. Arr. Fairport Convention) 3'46"  
"Sloth" (Richard Thompson / Dave Swarbrick) 11'56"  
Side 2  
"Staines Morris" (Trad. Arr. Fairport Convention) 3'42"  
"Matty Groves" (Trad. Arr. Fairport Convention) 8'42"  
"Jenny's Chickens / The Mason's Apron" (Trad. Arr. Fairport Convention) 4'36"  
"Battle of the Somme" (Pipe Major Robertson)  5'02"  
Notes- 
This LP contains some tracks recorded at the same time as those issued on " Live at the L.A. Troubadour" and some that were actually released on that LP. 
Track 2 is re-edited and remixed and is longer than the original version 
Tracks 3 is re-mastered and listed wrongly as " Toss the Feathers" 
Track 4 is a different take from that released on the earlier LP 
Track 6 is re-mastered 
Track 7 is re-edited and remixed and is shorter than the original version and is just listed as " Mason's Apron"

2001 reissue
"Sir Patrick Spens" (Trad. Arr. Fairport Convention) 3'28"  
"Banks of the Sweet Primroses" (Trad. Arr. Fairport Convention) 4'37"  
"The Lark in the Morning Medley" (Trad. Arr. Fairport Convention) 3'53"  
"Sloth" (Richard Thompson / Dave Swarbrick)  12'18"  
"Staines Morris" (Trad. Arr. Fairport Convention) 3'44"  
"Matty Groves" (Trad. Arr. Fairport Convention) 8'43"  
"Jenny's Chickens / The Mason's Apron" (Trad. Arr. Fairport Convention) 4'41"  
"Battle of the Somme" (Pipe Major Robertson)  5'01"  
"Bonnie Kate / Sir B. McKenzies" (Trad. Arr. Fairport Convention / Dave Swarbrick) 4'56"  
"Yellow Bird" (Marilyn Keith / Alan Bergman / Norman Luboff) 2'17"

Tracks, 1-8 are from " House Full" (Hannibal Records HNBL 1319) 
Tracks 9-10 are from " Live at the L.A. Troubadour" (Island Records HELP 28)

Personnel
Richard Thompson - electric guitar, vocals
Dave Swarbrick - vocals, fiddle, viola
Simon Nicol - rhythm guitar, vocals, mandolin (5), electric dulcimer (8)
Dave Pegg - bass guitar, vocals 
Dave Mattacks - drums, percussion

Recording
All tracks recorded 4–6 September 1970 at the L.A. Troubadour, Los Angeles.

Release history
UK (LP) Hannibal Records HNBL 1319 (June 1986) 
UK (CD) Hannibal Records HNCD 1319 (March 1990)
UK (CD) Island Records IMCD 289/586376-2 (8 October 2001) Remastered reissue with bonus tracks 
USA (CD) Hannibal Records HNCD 1319 (July 1990) 
AUSTRALIA (CD) Hannibal Records D41251 (1992) (imported CD with sticker on back containing Australian catalogue number 
JAPAN (CD) MIDI MDC6-1110 (August 1990)

References

External links
 - LP Entry from Expletive Delighted (Fairport Convention Fansite)
 - CD Entry from Expletive Delighted

Albums produced by Joe Boyd
Fairport Convention live albums
1986 live albums
Hannibal Records albums
Albums recorded at the Troubadour